WUVS-LP (103.7 FM, "103.7 The Beat") is a low power radio station licensed to Muskegon, Michigan.

Sources 
Michiguide.com - WUVS-LP History

External links
 

UVS-LP
UVS-LP
Urban contemporary radio stations in the United States
Radio stations established in 2002
2002 establishments in Michigan